Steven Kruijswijk (born 7 June 1987) is a Dutch road bicycle racer, who currently rides for UCI WorldTeam . Kruijswijk is best known for his strong ability in the mountains where he has taken his greatest success.

He has finished in the top 5 of all three Grand Tours, and was very close to winning the 2016 Giro d'Italia but lost the lead when he crashed into a snow bank on the penultimate mountain stage. He reached the podium for the first time in a Grand Tour when he placed 3rd overall in the 2019 Tour de France finishing 1:31 behind overall winner Egan Bernal.

Career

Early career
In 2009 he won the Under 23 category of the Dutch National Road Race Championships.

Rabobank (2010–present)

2011–2015
In 2011, Kruijswijk finished 8th overall in the Giro d'Italia and won Stage 6 in the Tour de Suisse, finishing third overall. His second career victory came at the Arctic Race of Norway in 2014.

In 2015, Kruijswijk led  at the Giro d'Italia. Although he lost time in the first week, Kruijswijk rode a strong second half of the race, finishing second to Mikel Landa on stage 16, the queen stage of the race. He eventually finished seventh overall, 10 minutes and 53 seconds down on Alberto Contador. Kruijswijk held the blue jersey as leader of the mountains classification from stages 16 to 18, and placed third in that competition behind Giovanni Visconti and Landa. With his efforts in the second half of the race, Kruijswijk was praised by many as the next general classification rider from the Netherlands. Kruijswijk took his form into the Tour de France where he helped teammate Robert Gesink finish in 6th place overall. Kruijswijk was also active himself on mountain stages by going into breakaways, however he had no luck of winning a stage.

2016

In 2016, Kruijswijk rode the Giro d'Italia again, which began with three stages in the Netherlands. On the queen stage of the race, stage 14, Kruijswijk finished second behind Esteban Chaves to take the overall lead by 41 seconds over Vincenzo Nibali. On stage 15, a mountainous time trial finishing on the Seiser Alm, Kruijswijk again finished second, this time to Alexander Foliforov to increase his lead to 2 minutes and 12 seconds over Chaves, as Nibali encountered mechanical issues, and dropped to third overall, 2 minutes 51 seconds behind Kruijswijk. Stage 16 saw Kruijswijk finish second for the third stage in a row, behind Alejandro Valverde and he increased his lead over Chaves to 3 minutes. However, on stage 19 Kruijswijk crashed on the descent of the Colle dell'Agnello whilst following an attack by Nibali and Chaves, landing on a bank of snow on the side of the road. Although he was able to continue, Kruijswijk finished the stage almost five minutes down on Nibali and more than four minutes behind Chaves, thus dropping to third overall. He visited the hospital after the stage where it was confirmed he had broken 2 ribs in the crash. Nonetheless, he started stage 20 where he lost further time and dropped behind Valverde to fourth overall, where he finished the Giro.

In July, Kruijswijk signed a two-year contract extension with the team. Following the disappointment of just missing out on the Giro win, Kruijswijk started the Vuelta a España, aiming to ride a good general classification in the race. He abandoned the race in the first week after a heavy crash.

2017

Kruijswijk aimed to win the 100th edition of the Giro d'Italia in 2017, after just missing out on the race win in 2016. His best result before the Giro was 7th overall at the Volta a Catalunya. He never reached his form from the previous year in the Giro however, and Kruijswijk abandoned the race in the last days due to illness. He quickly recovered at the Tour de Suisse, and reached the podium with 3rd overall. Kruijswijk never reached the form he had the previous year and only broke inside the top 10 on the final days; with a 7th place on the finish to Alto de l'Angliru, Kruijswijk finished 9th overall in the race.

2018

For the 2018 season, Kruijswijk's target was on the Tour de France together with co-captain Primož Roglič. At his final preparation race for the Tour de France, Kruijswijk reached 8th position at the Tour de Suisse. When arriving at the Tour de France, Kruijswijk had a decent start and only lost time on the stage 3 team time trial. When the race entered the mountains, Kruijswijk attacked on stage 12, and entered the breakaway. He still managed to fight for a top ten finish on the stage, and for his effort, Kruijswijk received the combativity award on stage 12. This also put him in good position to compete for a top 10 finish for the general classification, entering the third week in the high mountains of the Pyrenees. Kruijswijk stayed with the elite riders through the final week and rode a decent individual time trial on stage 20 to finish 5th overall.

Following his strong Tour de France campaign it was decided that Kruijswijk would ride Clásica de San Sebastián as one of the team leaders. Kruijswijk finished the race in 9th place with teammates Robert Gesink and Antwan Tolhoek taking 8th and 10th places respectively. Going into his second Grand Tour of the year, the Vuelta a España, Kruijswijk was awarded the role of team leader alongside George Bennett. With a strong performance in the first week it was then decided that  would ride 100% in pursuit of a podium with Kruijswijk. He entered the top 5 on stage 14 after an attack on the final climb of the stage. He finished fourth on the stage 16 individual time trial, advancing to 3rd place overall. On the following day however, Kruijswijk had a bad day on the steep climb to Balcón de Bizkaia, and dropped to 5th place overall. On the penultimate stage Kruijswijk once again entered the top 3 when he finished 3rd on stage 19. When three of his contenders for the podium rode away on the second last climb of the day, Kruijswijk hesitated and lost his podium place as he had to ride the final of the last climb at his own pace. He finished in 4th place overall.

2019
Early in the 2019 season he finished 5th in the Volta a Catalunya, and then 6th in the Tour de Romandie. He entered the Critérium du Dauphiné in June but did not finish the race. During the 2019 Tour de France Kruijswijk had good luck early in the race and found himself in a strong position going into the individual time trial on stage 13 where he finished 6th. This put him in 3rd place overall behind Julian Alaphilippe and only +0:46 behind defending champion Geraint Thomas. On stage 14 he finished 3rd on the stage coming in behind Thibaut Pinot and Alaphilippe, but he took a decent chunk of time out of Thomas and pulled within +0:12 of him in the overall standings. The standings would remain this way until stage 18, which included climbs of the Col du Galibier and Col d'Izoard. He kept pace with all of the GC contenders with the exception of Egan Bernal who took time out of all of them and jumped to 2nd place overall, knocking Kruijswijk off the podium in the process. On stage 19 Kruijswijk felt he had a chance to get back onto the podium, even though he had been dropped by Bernal, he was even with Thomas and both of them were putting time into Alaphilippe; however, due to mudslides, hail and severe weather the stage was cut short. After the stage he commented, "It's a bit shit that today had to be canceled halfway. It's a good decision when you see it, of course, but it wasn't in my favor." Due to this inclement weather stage 20 was also shortened, but Kruijswijk was able to secure his place on the podium when Alaphilippe was dropped by the GC riders.

2020
The 2020 cycling season was greatly reduced and altered due to the worldwide COVID-19 pandemic. As such Kruijswijk did not participate in many races and of the major races he entered including the Critérium du Dauphiné and 2020 Giro d'Italia, which was held late in the season, he did not finish.

2021
During the 2021 season many races were canceled or rescheduled, once again due to the pandemic, but the season was more normal than 2020. He rode in the Volta a Catalunya, Paris–Nice, Tour de Romandie and the Critérium du Dauphiné, finishing each race, but placing outside the top 10 in all of them. His strongest performance of the year was the 2021 Vuelta a España, where he finished 12th. Kruijswijk and Sepp Kuss both rode in support of Primož Roglič, who won the Vuelta for the 3rd year in a row. Shortly after the race former Tour de France winner Bradley Wiggins stated that Jumbo–Visma was the best team in the world.

2022
The team carried its strong form into the 2022 season and in some ways grew even stronger. Kruijswijk rode in support of Roglič and Jonas Vingegaard in several races early in the season where the team had a great deal of success with wins in Paris–Nice and the 2022 Critérium du Dauphiné. His best stage race result of the season was 7th during the Tour de Romandie. Going into the 2022 Tour de France Team Jumbo-Visma had a plan to isolate, confuse and break Tadej Pogačar and Kruijswijk played a key part in the enormously successful Tour until he crashed out on stage 15.

Major results

2005
 3rd Time trial, National Junior Road Championships
2007
 1st Prologue (TTT) Tour Alsace
 7th Overall Tour du Haut-Anjou
 9th Overall Thüringen Rundfahrt der U23
2008
 6th Overall Cinturó de l'Empordà
2009
 National Under-23 Road Championships
1st  Road race
2nd Time trial
 2nd Overall Thüringen Rundfahrt der U23
 4th Internationale Wielertrofee Jong Maar Moedig
 6th Time trial, UEC European Under-23 Road Championships
 8th Overall Tour of Ireland
 10th Overall Settimana Ciclistica Lombarda
2010
 8th Overall Vuelta a Burgos
2011
 3rd Overall Tour de Suisse
1st Stage 6
 8th Overall Giro d'Italia
2012
 8th Overall Tour de Suisse
 9th Overall Tour of Utah
2013
 10th Overall Tour of Alberta
2014
 1st  Overall Arctic Race of Norway
 7th Overall Tour de Langkawi
2015
 5th Overall Tour de l'Ain
 7th Overall Giro d'Italia
Held  after Stages 16–18
 7th Overall Tour of Britain
 10th Volta Limburg Classic
2016
 4th Overall Giro d'Italia
Held  after Stages 14–18
 5th Overall Tour de Yorkshire
2017
 3rd Overall Tour de Suisse
 5th Overall Tour de l'Ain
 7th Overall Volta a Catalunya
 8th Overall Volta a la Comunitat Valenciana
 9th Overall Vuelta a España
2018
 4th Overall Vuelta a España
 5th Overall Tour de France
 Combativity award Stage 12
 6th Overall Tour de Romandie
 7th Overall Vuelta a Andalucía
 8th Overall Volta a Catalunya
 8th Overall Tour de Suisse
 9th Clásica de San Sebastián
2019
 3rd Overall Tour de France
1st Stage 2 (TTT)
 3rd Overall Vuelta a Andalucía
 5th Overall Volta a Catalunya
 6th Overall Tour de Romandie
2020
 4th Overall Tour de l'Ain
2022
 7th Overall Tour de Romandie

General classification results timeline

References

External links

 
 

1987 births
Living people
Dutch male cyclists
People from Nuenen, Gerwen en Nederwetten
Tour de Suisse stage winners
UCI Road World Championships cyclists for the Netherlands
Cyclists from North Brabant
Cyclists at the 2016 Summer Olympics
Olympic cyclists of the Netherlands
20th-century Dutch people
21st-century Dutch people